Ademola "George" Bankole (born 9 September 1969) is a Nigerian former footballer who played as a goalkeeper in the Football League. As a journeyman having played for 15 different clubs during his career, his most notable stint came with Crewe Alexandra, a club he played for on two occasions, registering over 50 league appearances. He was the goalkeeping coach at Colchester United for nine years.

Career

Born in Abeokuta, Bankole began his career with Shooting Stars in his native Nigeria. He moved to England in 1995, signing for Doncaster Rovers, spending a month with the club prior to signing with Leyton Orient. He left Orient in September 1996 having registered no games, joining Crewe Alexandra. He made six appearances for the club between 1996 and 1998. He played seven games in 1997 on loan at Hyde United, earning the man of the match award in the Cheshire Senior Cup final in a 3–0 victory over Macclesfield Town. In 1998, Bankole moved to Queens Park Rangers, making only one substitute appearance for the club. Bankole was sent out on loan to Bradford City while the club were in the Premier League, acting as cover.

Bankole returned to Crewe for a fee of £50,000 in the summer of 2000. Here, he had his greatest success as a player, featuring in 52 league games. While contracted to Crewe, Bankole was called up to the preliminary Nigeria squad prior to the 2002 FIFA World Cup but did not make the final squad. Towards the end of his stint with Crewe and being out of the first-team, Bankole joined Barnet in a three-month loan deal.

In the summer of 2004, Bankole was released by Crewe, temporarily joining Lewes, Windsor & Eton and Maidenhead United in non-league before being picked up by Brentford in February 2005. He spent a year-and-a-half with the Bees, before signing to Milton Keynes Dons in July 2006. He made six appearances for each club.

Bankole left MK Dons in early 2008, joining Nuneaton Borough before being signed by Colchester United as goalkeeper cover for Aidan Davison following Mark Cousins being taken ill with appendicitis, also signing as a temporary coach for the club. Bankole did not make an appearance for Colchester, but was named as permanent goalkeeping coach at the club following Davison's retirement and subsequent move to the United States.

Bankole spent nine years as Colchester's goalkeeping coach until he left in the summer of 2017 when the club had a restructuring of backroom staff. Since 2019 George has been a coach with the QPR under 18 and 23 squads.

Career statistics

A.  The "Other" column constitutes appearances and goals (including those as a substitute) in the Football League Trophy.

References

External links

1969 births
Living people
Sportspeople from Abeokuta
Nigerian footballers
Nigerian expatriate footballers
Association football goalkeepers
Shooting Stars S.C. players
Doncaster Rovers F.C. players
Leyton Orient F.C. players
Crewe Alexandra F.C. players
Hyde United F.C. players
Queens Park Rangers F.C. players
Bradford City A.F.C. players
Barnet F.C. players
Lewes F.C. players
Windsor & Eton F.C. players
Maidenhead United F.C. players
Brentford F.C. players
Milton Keynes Dons F.C. players
Nuneaton Borough F.C. players
Colchester United F.C. players
English Football League players
National League (English football) players
Northern Premier League players
Colchester United F.C. non-playing staff
Yoruba sportspeople
20th-century Nigerian people